Melbourne Covell "Bob" Evans (November 16, 1889 – August 29, 1964) was an American football, basketball, and baseball coach. He served as the head football coach at the University of Colorado at Boulder in 1916 and 1917 and at Stanford University in 1919, compiling a career college football record of 11–10–1. Evans was also the head basketball coach at Colorado (1917–1918) and Stanford (1918–1920), tallying a career college basketball mark of 30–8, and the head baseball coach at Colorado (1918) and Stanford (1919–1920), amassing a career college baseball record of 18–17. He was also a football official and worked a number of Rose Bowls.

Evans later worked as a grain broker for Evan & Breckenridge in San Francisco. He died on August 29, 1964, at  Mills Memorial Hospital in San Mateo, California.

Head coaching record

Football

References

1889 births
1964 deaths
American men's basketball players
College football officials
Colorado Buffaloes baseball coaches
Colorado Buffaloes football coaches
Colorado Buffaloes men's basketball coaches
Millikin Big Blue football players
Millikin Big Blue men's basketball players
Stanford Cardinal baseball coaches
Stanford Cardinal football coaches
Stanford Cardinal men's basketball coaches
People from Oxford, Nebraska
Players of American football from Nebraska
Coaches of American football from Nebraska
Baseball coaches from Nebraska
Basketball coaches from Nebraska
Basketball players from Nebraska